Ferry Meadows is a station on the Nene Valley Railway between Wansford and Orton Mere. The current station has one platform, and has no car park of its own. In 2004, a new station building was added. Previously at Fletton Junction on the East Coast Main Line, the building was dismantled, moved to Ferry Meadows and rebuilt brick-by-brick in its current location. In the Nene Park close by, there is a watersports centre as well as three children's play areas, three lakes and a miniature railway. The Park is open throughout the year, but most facilities such as the miniature railway and pedaloes only run from Easter to the end of October. Ferry Meadows station is on the site of the former Orton Waterville station.

On 1 June 2017, Ferry Meadows was renamed to its original name of Overton as part of the Nene Valley Railways 40th anniversary celebrations.

Ferry Meadows appears briefly in two James Bond films, GoldenEye and Octopussy.

History
Orton Waterville railway station served the villages of Orton Waterville and Orton Longueville in Cambridgeshire. It was on the London and North Western Railway Northampton to Peterborough line. The station was originally called Overton. The station was closed to regular passenger trains in 1942 but was used by railway staff until the Wansford to Peterborough section closed in 1966 and subsequently the station was demolished. A new station Ferry Meadows was constructed on the same site and was opened with the line in 1977 by the Nene Valley Railway. On 1 June 2017 it was renamed Overton for Ferry Meadows

Night Mail
Ferry Meadows Station will be the site of the Nene Valley's Travelling Post Office (TPO) Museum. 'Night Mail', The International Story of Mail by Rail, will be unique in telling the story of mail across the Continent thanks to the NVR's unique collection of Mail and European rail vehicles. The museum will house both British mail carriages, a number of road vehicles and Continental vehicles. This includes the last surviving coach from the Great Train Robbery.

The Project is being driven by 'The Friends of M30272M' and 'The International Railway Preservation Society'. Construction of an initial four coach running shed is due to start in 2013.

References

External links
 Orton Waterville station on navigable 1946 O. S. map
 Orton Waterville station on Subterranea Britannica

Nene Valley Railway
Heritage railway stations in Cambridgeshire
Former London and North Western Railway stations
Railway stations in Great Britain opened in 1845
Railway stations in Great Britain closed in 1942
Railway stations in Great Britain opened in 1977
Transport in Peterborough
Buildings and structures in Peterborough
Railway stations built for UK heritage railways